Tylden railway station, a former station on the Daylesford railway line in Victoria, Australia, was located about 2.4 km to the east of Tylden township, near Central Road. The station opened at the same time as the Carlsruhe to Trentham section of the line on 16 February 1880, and closing on or before 3 July 1978 when the line was closed. 

The Tylden Railway Station building was moved one mile West of its original location and placed on bluestone footings, behind a circa 1860-70's Victorian house at the intersection of Chanters Lane and the Woodend- Trentham Road. In 2015/16, as part of controversial expansion of a bluestone mine on the edge of the Tylden township, New Zealand owned Multi National Corporation, Fulton Hogan, demolished the Victorian home, an adjoining historic Shearing shed and the Tylden Railway Station building, with an excavator, feeding the remains of all buildings through a tub grinder, turning it to mulch, where it still lies to this day. This is despite several attempts by locals in the region to relocate or save the building. 

The tracks have been dismantled, but a single platform embankment remains.

By 1969, the platform was 46m in length, and by 1975, the station was working under no-one-in-charge conditions.

The station was 90.9 km from Spencer Street Station (Southern Cross railway station), via Carlsruhe.

References

Disused railway stations in Victoria (Australia)